"Can I See You Tonight" is a song written by Deborah Allen and Rafe Van Hoy. The song was first recorded by Jewel Blanch for RCA Records in 1979, reaching No. 33 on the Hot Country Songs charts.

It was later recorded by American country music artist Tanya Tucker, and was released in December 1980 as the second single from her album Dreamlovers.  The song reached #4 on the Billboard Hot Country Singles & Tracks chart.

Chart performance

References

External links
 Can I See You Tonight - Live In Dickson, YouTube

Songs about nights
1981 singles
1979 songs
Tanya Tucker songs
Songs written by Deborah Allen
MCA Records singles
Songs written by Rafe Van Hoy
Song recordings produced by Jerry Crutchfield